The Green Bay Packers joined the National Football League (NFL) in 1921, two years after their original founding by Curly Lambeau. They participated in the first ever NFL draft in 1936 and selected Russ Letlow, a guard from the University of San Francisco. The team's most recent first-round selections were Quay Walker and Devonte Wyatt, both from Georgia in the 2022 NFL Draft. The Packers have selected the number one overall pick in the draft twice, choosing future Hall of Fame halfback Paul Hornung in 1957 and quarterback Randy Duncan in 1959. They have also selected the second overall pick three times and the third overall pick once. The team's eight selections from the University of Minnesota are the most chosen by the Packers from one university.

Every year during April, each NFL franchise seeks to add new players to its roster through a collegiate draft officially known as "the NFL Annual Player Selection Meeting" but more commonly known as the NFL Draft. Teams are ranked in inverse order based on the previous season's record, with the worst record picking first, and the second worst picking second and so on. The two exceptions to this order are made for teams that appeared in the previous Super Bowl; the Super Bowl champion always picks 32nd, and the Super Bowl loser always picks 31st. Playoff teams will not pick before a non-playoff team when determining the initial draft order. So a division winner with a losing record would have a lower pick after a 10–6 team that didn't make the playoffs. Teams have the option of trading away their picks to other teams for different picks, players, cash, or a combination thereof. Thus, it is not uncommon for a team's actual draft pick to differ from their assigned draft pick, or for a team to have extra or no draft picks in any round due to these trades.

Key

Player selections

Footnotes

Russ Letlow was the first draft pick in the history of the Packers, and the first guard collegiately drafted into the NFL.
The New York Giants traded the 4th draft pick to the Packers. Terms unknown.
The Packers won the lottery bonus pick.
The Packers traded Jim Ringo and Earl Gros to the Philadelphia Eagles for the 7th pick of the 1965 first round and Lee Roy Caffey.
The Packers traded Ron Kramer to the Detroit Lions for the 9th pick of the 1966 first round.
The Packers traded Lloyd Voss and Tony Jeter to the Pittsburgh Steelers for the 9th pick of 1967 first round.
The New Orleans Saints traded the 5th pick of the 1968 first round to the Packers.
The Packers traded Bob Hyland, Elijah Pitts and Lee Roy Caffey to the Chicago Bears for the 2nd pick of the 1970 first round.
The Denver Broncos traded Alden Roche and the 9th pick of the 1971 first round to the Packers for Don Horn and the 12th pick of the 1971 first round (Marv Montgomery).
The Packers traded Don Horn, their 5th pick of the 1972 first round (Riley Odoms) to the Denver Broncos for the 7th pick of the 1972 first round and Alden Roche.
The Packers traded Kevin Hardy to the San Diego Chargers for the 11th pick of the 1972 first round.
The St. Louis Rams traded John Hadl to the Packers for the 1975 first-round pick (Mike Fanning), a 1975 second-round pick, a 1975 third-round pick, a 1976 first-round pick, and a 1976 second-round pick.
The Packers traded Ted Hendricks to the Oakland Raiders for the 23rd pick of the 1976 first round.
The Packers received the 28th pick of the 1977 first round from the Oakland Raiders to compensate for Ted Hendricks.
The Packers traded Mike P. McCoy to the Oakland Raiders for the 26th pick of the 1978 first round, Herb McMath, and a 1979 fourth-round pick which was later traded to Washington Redskins.
The Packers traded Willie Buchanon to the San Diego Chargers for the 26th pick of the 1980 first round and a 1979 seventh-round pick.
The Packers traded Aundra Thompson, the 13th pick of the 1982 first round (Lindsay Scott), their 1983 first-round pick, a 1982 second-round pick and a 1984 second-round pick to the San Diego Chargers for John Jefferson and a 1982 first-round pick.

The Packers traded Bruce Clark to the Pittsburgh Steelers for the 11th pick of the 1983 first round.
The Buffalo Bills traded the 7th pick of the 1985 first round and a pick from the 1986 fourth round to the Packers for the 14th pick of the 1985 first round and a pick from the 1985 second round.
The San Diego Chargers traded Mossy Cade to the Packers for the 1986 first-round pick (Gerald Robinson) and a 1987 conditional fifth-round pick.
The Packers traded their 1989 second-round pick and their 1989 fifth-round pick to the Cleveland Browns for the 18th pick in the 1990 first round, Herman Fontenot, a 1989 third-round pick and a 1989 fifth-round pick.
The Packers traded the 8th pick of the 1991 first round to the Philadelphia Eagles for the 19th pick of the 1991 first round and a 1992 first-round pick.
The Atlanta Falcons traded Brett Favre to the Packers for the 1992 first-round pick they received from the Eagles in 1991 and a 1992 fourth-round pick.
The Packers traded two 1993 second-round picks, their 1993 fourth-round pick, 1993 eighth-round pick to the Dallas Cowboys for the 29th pick of the first round and a 1993 fourth-round pick.
The Miami Dolphins traded the 16th pick of the 1994 first round to the Packers for the 20th pick of the 1994 first round and a 1994 third-round pick.
The Carolina Panthers traded the 32nd pick of the 1995 first round, a 1995 third-round pick, and a 1995 sixth-round pick to the Packers for a 1995 second-round pick and a 1995 sixth-round pick.
The Miami Dolphins traded the 19th pick of the 1998 first round to Packers for the 29th pick of the 1998 first round and a 1998 second-round pick.
The Packers traded Matt Hasselbeck, the 17th pick of the 2001 first round (Steve Hutchinson) and a 2001 seventh-round pick to the Seattle Seahawks for the 10th pick of the 2001 first round and a 2001 third-round pick.
The Seattle Seahawks traded the 20th pick of the 2002 first round and a 2002 fifth-round pick to the Packers for a 2002 first-round pick (Jerramy Stevens) and a 2002 second-round pick.
The Packers traded the 30th pick of the 2008 first round to the New York Jets for a 2008 second-round pick and a 2008 fourth-round pick.
The Patriots traded the 26th pick of the 2009 first round and a fifth-round pick to the Packers for a 2009 second-round pick and two 2009 third-round picks.
The Packers traded out of the first round of the 2017 NFL draft and selected cornerback Kevin King with the first pick of the second round.

References
General
 
 
 
 
 
 

Specific

Green Bay Packers

first-round draft picks